John Kenneth Johnston (June 28, 1865 – May 1945) was a lawyer, farmer and political figure in Saskatchewan. He represented Pelly in the Legislative Assembly of Saskatchewan from 1908 to 1917 as a Liberal.

He was born in Crinan, Aldborough Township, Elgin County, Ontario, the son of Duncan M. Johnston and Harriet Urquart, and was educated at Queen's University. Johnston taught school in Smiths Falls, Ontario, came west in 1900 and then was principal for a high school in Calgary, Alberta. He later settled in Kamsack, Saskatchewan. Johnston established law offices in Kamsack and Canora. He ran unsuccessfully for election to the provincial assembly as an independent in 1929. Johnston died at home in Kamsack at the age of 79.

References 

Saskatchewan Liberal Party MLAs
1865 births
1945 deaths
People from Kamsack, Saskatchewan
People from Elgin County